Dobromir Georgiev Zhechev (born 12 November 1942) is a Bulgarian former football player and later manager. Zhechev was born in Sofia.

At club level he played Spartak and Levski in his home town. He was also capped 93 times for the Bulgaria national team and was part of the squad at four World Cups, which makes him the only Bulgarian footballer who has played in four FIFA World Cups so far. European champion with the Bulgarian national under-19 team in 1959. Dobromir Zhechev is also 1973–76 Balkan Cup champion. As manager of Levski Sofia, he won one Bulgarian Cup in 1982.

Honours

Club 
Spartak Sofia
 Bulgarian Cup (1): 1967–68
Levski Sofia
 A PFG (2): 1969–70, 1973–74
 Bulgarian Cup (2): 1969–70, 1970–71

External links
 
 Profile at levskisofia.info

1942 births
Living people
Bulgarian footballers
Bulgaria international footballers
PFC Levski Sofia players
First Professional Football League (Bulgaria) players
1962 FIFA World Cup players
1966 FIFA World Cup players
1970 FIFA World Cup players
1974 FIFA World Cup players
Bulgarian football managers
PFC Levski Sofia managers
Aris Thessaloniki F.C. managers
PAS Giannina F.C. managers
Veria F.C. managers
Bulgarian expatriates in Greece
Footballers from Sofia
Association football defenders
Expatriate football managers in Greece
Bulgarian expatriate football managers